Feldunterarzt (short: FUArzt or FUA; literal: field under physician) was a military rank in the German Wehrmacht until 1945. It was established additional to the Unterarzt July 25, 1940. Uniform and shoulder board were identical to the Fahnenjunker-Oberfeldwebel (Oberfähnrich), however without the double unterofficer galloons. The Gothic letter A between the two silver felwebel stars indicated the membership to the Military Medical Academy in Berlin. The Feldunterarzt was an officer aspirant (de: Offizier-Anwärter, short OA or O.A.) in the Military Health Service. 

According to the rank hierarchy, it was comparable to Sergeant First Class (de: Oberfeldwebel) or Chief Petty Officer (de: Oberbootsmann) NATO-Rangcode OR-7

He had passed the first (physician‘s or dentist‘s) medical state examination on the Military Medical Academy, and received practical training in the medical corps or in line medical service in a military unit in the Heer or Luftwaffe. Then he turned back to the Military Medical Academy, in order to be promoted to the Assistenzarzt, the lowest officer rank, comparable to second lieutenant (NATO OF-1b).

Wehrmacht

Heer 
In line to the so-called Reichsbesoldungsordnung (en: Reich's salary order), appendixes to the Salary law of the German Empire (de: Besoldungsgesetz des Deutschen Reiches) of 1927 (changes 1937 – 1940), the comparative ranks were as follows: C 15

Oberfeldwebel (Heer and Luftwaffe) 
Unterarzt (medical service of the Wehrmacht)
Feldunterarzt, from 1940
Unterveterinär (veterinarian service of the Wehrmacht)

The corps colour of the Military Health System in German armed forces was traditional , and of the veterinarian service . This tradition was continued by the medical service corps in Heer and Luftwaffe of the Reichswehr and Wehrmacht.

Address 
The manner of formal addressing of military surgeons/dentists with the rank Feldunterarzt was, „Herr Feldunterarzt“.

See also
Corps colours of the German Army (1935–1945)
Ranks and insignia of the German Army (1935–1945)

References 

Military ranks of Germany